Primož Klenovšek named Klimovsky was (born 27 December 1983) is a Slovenian  motorcycle speedway rider who was a member of Slovenia team at 2001 Speedway World Cup.

Honours

World Championships 

 Team World Championship  (Speedway World Team Cup and Speedway World Cup)
 2001 - 12th place (0 pts in Event 2)

European Championships 

 2000 Individual Speedway Junior European Championship
 2000 -  Ljubljana - 14th place (3 pts)

See also 
 Slovenia national speedway team

References

External links 
 (en) (pl) Primoz Klimkovsky at www.lubusports.pl

Slovenian speedway riders
1983 births
Living people
People from Trbovlje